Kampong Kiulap is a village in Brunei-Muara District, Brunei, as well as a neighbourhood and commercial area in the capital Bandar Seri Begawan. It is one of the villages within Mukim Gadong 'B'. The postcode is BE1518.

The village is home to Raja Isteri Pengiran Anak Saleha Hospital, the country's main hospital.

Geography 
Kiulap is located in the heart of Bandar Seri Begawan, close to the City Centre as well as Gadong, another commercial area in the capital. It is also contiguous with Kiarong, another neighbourhood-cum-commercial area. The Kedayan River flows along the eastern part Kiulap, which also serves its border with Kumbang Pasang.

The construction of two parallel roads, namely the Sultan Hassanal Bolkiah Highway and Jalan Jame' Asr, have divided Kiulap into three sub-areas. Two of the portions comprise the neighbourhoods, where as the other part constitutes the commercial area; it is located in the northern part of Kiulap as well as near the Kedayan River.

Administration 
Apart from being a village subdivision, Kampong Kiarong has also been subsumed under the municipal area of the capital Bandar Seri Begawan.

Economy

Commercial area 

Kiulap is one of the few commercial areas in Bandar Seri Begawan. It mainly consists of complexes of shophouses which contain various types of businesses, most notably retail and eateries. There is a small shopping mall with a cineplex, a few hotels and offices.

Infrastructure

Roads 

Two dual-carriageway, controlled-access highways traverse the Kiulap area. The Sultan Hassanal Bolkiah Highway and Jalan Jame' Asr run in parallel direction with each other in Kiulap but nevertheless converge at a roundabout junction in neighbouring Kiarong. The roads cause Kiulap to be separated into three portions. The central part which is a neighbourhood is served by Jalan Kiulap and is accessible to both roads, although indirectly via Simpang 127. The northern part is the commercial area and served by Jalan Komersial Kiulap which has direct access to Jalan Jame' Asr. The southern part, the other neighbourhood, is not accessible from within Kiulap, it is served by Jalan Kiarong, hence only accessible from Kiarong.

School 
There is a public primary school which serves the residents of Kiulap, namely Haji Mohammad Jaafar Maun Primary School.

Kiulap is also home to the International Graduate Studies College, one of the few private post-secondary institutions in the country.

See also 
 Kampong Kiarong

References 

Villages in Brunei-Muara District
Neighbourhoods in Bandar Seri Begawan